Rissoina multicostata is a species of minute sea snail, a marine gastropod mollusk or micromollusk in the family Rissoinidae.

Distribution
This species occurs in the Caribbean Sea and the Gulf of Mexico.

Description 
The maximum recorded shell length is 5.2 mm.

Habitat 
Minimum recorded depth is 0 m. Maximum recorded depth is 525 m.

References

 Adams, C. B., 1850. Descriptions of supposed new species of marine shells, which inhabit Jamaica. Contributions to Conchology 7: 109-123
 Rosenberg, G., F. Moretzsohn, and E. F. García. 2009. Gastropoda (Mollusca) of the Gulf of Mexico, Pp. 579–699 in Felder, D.L. and D.K. Camp (eds.), Gulf of Mexico–Origins, Waters, and Biota. Biodiversity. Texas A&M Press, College Station, Texas

External links
 

Rissoinidae
Gastropods described in 1850